Godana Doyo is a Kenyan politician who was the first Governor of Isiolo County from 2013 to 2017, elected as a member of the United Republican Party (before it joined the Jubilee Party). He was defeated in his re-election bid, this time as a member of the Party of Development and Reforms, by Mohammed Kuti.
Doyo was cleared of all cases filed by the Ethics and Anti-Corruption Commission.

References

Living people
1970 births
United Republican Party (Kenya) politicians
Jubilee Party politicians
County Governors of Kenya
University of Nairobi alumni